Haystack Hills is a range in the U.S. state of Wisconsin.

Haystack Hills was descriptively named on account of its shape.

References

Landforms of Sauk County, Wisconsin
Mountains of Wisconsin